Mordecai (also Mordechai; ,) is one of the main personalities in the Book of Esther in the Hebrew Bible. He is described as being the son of Jair, of the tribe of Benjamin. He was promoted to Vizier after Haman was killed.

Biblical account 

Mordecai resided in Susa (Shushan or Shoushan), the metropolis of Persia (now Iran). He adopted his orphaned cousin (Esther 2:7), Hadassah (Esther), whom he brought up as if she were his own daughter. When "young virgins" were sought, she was taken into the presence of King Ahasuerus and was made queen in the place of the exiled queen Vashti. Subsequently, Mordecai discovered a plot of the king's chamberlains Bigthan and Teresh to assassinate the king. Because of Mordecai's vigilance, the plot was foiled.

Haman the Agagite had been raised to the highest position at court. In spite of the king's decree that all should prostrate themselves before Haman, Mordecai refused to do so. Haman, stung by Mordecai's refusal, resolved to kill not only Mordecai but all Jewish exiles throughout the Persian empire, and won the king's permission to carry out his plan. Mordecai communicated Haman's scheme to Queen Esther, who used her favor with the king to reverse the scheme, leading the king to authorize Jews to kill their enemies, which they did. 

During all this, the king had happened to remember Mordecai's service in foiling the assassination plot and had asked Haman how a person who did a great service to the king should be honored. Haman answered, thinking the question was about him; and the king followed this advice, and honored Mordecai, and eventually made Mordecai his chief advisor. Haman was executed on gallows that he had set up for Mordecai. 

The feast of Purim celebrates these reversals.

History

Book of Esther

Although the details of the setting are entirely plausible and the story may even have some basis in actual events, the book of Esther is a novella rather than history. Persian kings did not marry outside of seven Persian noble families, making it unlikely that there was a Jewish queen Esther, and in any case the historical Xerxes's queen was Amestris.

There is general agreement that the story was created to justify the Jewish appropriation of an originally non-Jewish feast. The festival which the book explains is purim, which is explained as meaning "lot", from the Babylonian word puru.  There are wide-ranging theories regarding the origin of Purim: one popular theory says festival has its origins in a historicized Babylonian myth or ritual in which Mordecai and Esther represent the Babylonian gods Marduk and Ishtar, others trace the ritual to the Persian New Year, and scholars have surveyed other theories in their works Some scholars have defended the story as real history, but the attempt to find a historical kernel to the narrative "is likely to be futile".

Name 
The name "Mordecai" is of uncertain origin but is considered identical to the name Marduka or Marduku, attested as the name of up to four Persian court officials in thirty texts (the Persepolis Administrative Archives) from the period of Xerxes I and his father Darius.

The Talmud (Menachot 64b and 65a) relates that his full name was "Mordechai Bilshan" (which occurs in Ezra 2:2 and Nehemiah 7:7, albeit likely as two separate names in sequence). Hoschander interpreted this as the Babylonian "Marduk Belshunu" (𒀭𒀫𒌓𒂗𒋗𒉡, dAMAR.UTU-EN-šu-nu, meaning "Marduk is their lord") "Mordecai" being thus a hypocorism.

In the King James Version of the deuterocanonical Greek additions to Esther, his name is spelled as Mardocheus, which may better preserve the original vowels, though the Masoretic Text versions of the Persian names in the Bible are known to be the most reliable.

Age 

Esther 2:5-6 contains a short snippet of Mordecai's genealogical history, generally translated as, "Mordecai, the son of Jair, the son of Shimei, the son of Kish, who had been carried into exile from Jerusalem by Nebuchadnezzar king of Babylon, among those taken captive with Jeconiah king of Judah". The wording of the passage lends to two conclusions: either that Mordecai (the son of Jair, the son of Shimei, the son of Kish) was carried into exile by Nebuchadnezzar, or that his ancestor Kish was the one carried into exile.

The Pentecostal minister Finis Dake interprets the Bible verses Esther 2:5–6 to mean that Mordecai himself was exiled by Nebuchadnezzar. Biblical scholar Michael D. Coogan discusses this as an inaccuracy regarding Mordecai's age. If "who had been carried into exile" refers to Mordecai, he would have had to live over a century to have witnessed the events described in the Book of Esther (assuming the biblical Ahasuerus is indeed Xerxes I). However, the verse may be read as referring not to Mordecai's exile to Babylon, but to his great-grandfather Kish's exile — a reading which many accept.

Genealogy 

The Targum Sheni gives his genealogy in more detail, as follows: "Mordecai, son of Jair, son of Shimei, son of Shemida, son of Ba'anah, son of Elah, son of Micah, son of Mephibosheth, son of Jonathan, son of Saul, son of Kish, son of Abiel, son of Zeror, son of Bechorath, son of Aphiah, son of Shecharim, son of Uzziah, son of Sason, son of Michael, son of Eliel, son of Amihud, son of Shephatiah, son of Penuel, son of Petakh, son of Melokh, son of Yerubaal, son of Yeruham, son of Hananiah, son of Zabdi, son of Elpa'al, son of Shimri, son of Zebadiah, son of Rimoth, son of Khashum, son of Shekhorah, son of Gazza, son of 'Uzza, son of Gera, son of Bela, son of Benjamin, son of Jacob the firstborn, whose name is called Israel." The same genealogy is inscribed on a massive metal tablet in the Tomb of Esther and Mordechai (pictured). 

This traditional genealogy implicates Kish as the name of an ancient ancestor and not simply Mordecai's great-grandfather, meaning that Esther 2:5—6 was interpreted as Mordecai being the one who was exiled to Babylon. The chronological inconsistencies of this assumption are detailed above.

Prophet status 
The Talmud lists Esther as a prophet. Nachman b. Yaakov suggests that Mordecai is the Biblical prophet Malachi, but this argument is rejected by the Talmud.

Mordecai's genealogy in the second chapter of the Book of Esther is given as a descendant of a Benjaminite named Kish. As "Kish" was also the name of the father of King Saul, another Benjaminite, the Talmud accords Mordecai the status of a descendant of the first King of Israel.

See also 
 Marduk
 Persian Jews

Notes

References

Bibliography

External links 

Jewish Encyclopedia: Mordecai in Esther and in Rabbinical literature
Modesty and Myrrh: Mordecai in Kabbalah

Hebrew Bible people
Book of Esther
Iranian Jews
Esther
Tribe of Benjamin